Riccardo Zinna (18 May 1958 – 20 September 2018) was an Italian actor and musician.

Zinna studied under Augusto Perez at the Accademia di Belle Arti di Napoli and at the Conservatorio "Licinio Refice". He began his acting career, which spanned four decades, in theatre in 1975. Zinna was also a guitarist, trumpeter, and composer. 

Zinna died of pancreatic cancer at the age of 60 on 20 September 2018. Zinna's funeral was held at the Santa Maria del Buon Consiglio in Naples.

Selected filmography
The Yes Man (1991)
The Great Pumpkin (1993)
Caro diario (1993)
With Closed Eyes (1994)
Nirvana (1997)
Denti (2000)
This Is Not Paradise (2000)
Light of My Eyes (2001)
A Neapolitan Spell (2002)
I'm Not Scared (2003)
Remember Me, My Love (2003)
On My Skin (2003)
The Remains of Nothing (2004)
Really SSSupercool: Chapter Two (2006)
The Goodbye Kiss (2006)
Flying Lessons (2007)
Gomorrah (2008)
Benvenuti al Sud (2010)
Siberian Education (2013)

References

External links

1958 births
2018 deaths
People from Naples
20th-century Italian male actors
Italian male stage actors
Italian male film actors
Italian trumpeters
Male trumpeters
Italian guitarists
20th-century Italian composers
Italian film score composers
21st-century Italian male actors
21st-century Italian composers
Italian male film score composers
20th-century Italian male musicians
21st-century Italian male musicians
Deaths from cancer in Campania
Deaths from pancreatic cancer